Nyirol is a county in Jonglei State, South Sudan.

References

Counties of Jonglei State